The MDW Tag Team Championship is a professional wrestling tag team championship in Mason-Dixon Wrestling (MDW). It was the original tag team title of the Atlantic Coast Championship Wrestling promotion during its first year of operation. In December 1998, the promotion became Mason-Dixon Wrestling and the title became the MDW Tag Team Championship.

The inaugural champions were The Batten Twins (Brad and Bart Batten), after defeating Dark Overlord and Gatekeeper in New Martinsville, West Virginia on November 1, 1997 to become the first ACCW Tag Team Champions. The Thrillbillies (Ox Williams and Jed Goodman) hold the record for most reigns, with five. At 320 days, The Thrillbillies's first championship reign is the longest in the title's history. The Masked Assassins' fourth and final reign was the shortest in the history of the title lasting only 1 day. Overall, there have been 20 reigns shared between 11 teams, with two vacancies.

Title history
Key

Names

Reigns

List of top combined reigns

By team

By wrestler

References
General

Specific

External links

MDW Tag Team Championship at Cagematch.de
MDW Tag Team Championship at USA Indy Wrestling

Mason-Dixon Wrestling championships
Tag team wrestling championships